Oleh Lisohor (born 17 January 1979 in Brovary, Kyiv Oblast, Soviet Union) is a Ukrainian swimmer.

Career
Lisohor is the former world record holder in the 50 metres breaststroke, long course, with 27.18 seconds. The record was set in Berlin on 2 August 2002. Lisohor is also the former record holder over 50 metres breaststroke (short course). He took part in three Olympic Games. He won two world titles in the 50 m breaststroke, in 2001 and 2007. He made an appearance in Régis Wargnier's film East/West.

See also
 World record progression 50 metres breaststroke

References

External links
 

1979 births
Living people
Ukrainian male swimmers
Olympic swimmers of Ukraine
Male breaststroke swimmers
Swimmers at the 2000 Summer Olympics
Swimmers at the 2004 Summer Olympics
Swimmers at the 2008 Summer Olympics
World record setters in swimming
World Aquatics Championships medalists in swimming
Medalists at the FINA World Swimming Championships (25 m)
European Aquatics Championships medalists in swimming
Universiade medalists in swimming
Universiade gold medalists for Ukraine
Universiade silver medalists for Ukraine
Universiade bronze medalists for Ukraine
Medalists at the 2001 Summer Universiade
Medalists at the 2003 Summer Universiade
Medalists at the 2005 Summer Universiade
People from Brovary
Sportspeople from Kyiv Oblast